Squeal may refer to:

A term for providing privileged information about a person or an agency, usually performed by an informant
"Squeal" (song), song by No Doubt
Brake squeal, sound created by a disc brake
Rail squeal, sound created by a train braking on a railroad track

See also
Squealer (disambiguation)
Squee (disambiguation)